Nijmeddin Dajani (born August 7, 1928) was a Jordanian economist and ambassador.

Career
From 1950 to 1952 he was employed at the Department of Statistics, Ministry of Economy, Damascus.
From 1952 to 1955 he was Economic Analyst, UNRWA, Amman.
In 1957 he graduated as Research Assistant.
From 1957 to 1958 he was UNRWA economic analyst.
From 1958 to 1962 he was Director of Economic Planning and Research.
From 1964 to 1968 he was Secretary General and Vice President of the Jordan Development Board.
From 1968 to 1976 he was Ambassador in Bonn (West Germany), Denmark, Sweden, Norway, Luxembourg and the European Economic Community.
In 1976 he was Minister of Trade and Industry.

Publications
Yarmouk, Jordan Valley Project: an Economic Appraisal.

Decorations
 Jordan Independence Medal

References

1928 births
Living people
Ambassadors of Jordan to Germany
Trade ministers of Jordan
Industry ministers of Jordan
Alumni of the University of Wales
 University of Wisconsin–Madison alumni